Bernie LaBarge (born March 11, 1953) is a Canadian performing and session guitarist, an award-winning singer and songwriter, and producer, who has gone on tour and made recordings with Canadian and international artists.

In a wide-ranging career that began in 1967, LaBarge signed with WEA Records and released a single entitled "Dream Away" in 1981. LaBarge earned a Canadian Juno Award nomination in 1984 for Most Promising Male Vocalist for his album, “Barging In” on the Sony label. Then, LaBarge won the Canadian Songwriting Contest in 1986 (Best R&B Song category). His song "Dream Away" was produced by famous producer Daniel Lanois. “Dream Away” was one of the most-played songs of 1981, and still receives extensive airplay.

Along the way, LaBarge has been the guitarist/front man for popular performing acts like Rain, Sweet Blindness, Zwol, Stem, Stingaree, The Irish Rovers, Cassandra Vasik, The Dexters, and the George Olliver band. He has recorded and toured with a wide range of talent like The Irish Rovers, Doug Riley, Ian Tyson, David Clayton-Thomas, Rhinoceros, and Long John Baldry. And, he has proudly performed with Hall of Famers Domenic Troiano, Ronnie Hawkins, John Kay, John Sebastian, David Cassidy, and Rush’s Alex Lifeson.

LaBarge kicked off yet another decade in 2020 by rocking a reunion of the much beloved band, The Dexters, who were originally founded in 1994 in Toronto. And, fellow guitarist Alex Lifeson, whose legendary Canadian band Rush were inducted into the Rock & Roll Hall of Fame, says of his pal's career: "Bernie is my brother. We've shared so many happy, fun times together doing what we both love most. I have learned from his guitar playing and I think it's made me a fuller player. His sense of rhythm and dynamics is a strong suit I admire."

Life and career

Early life
LaBarge was born in Ottawa, Ontario, also home to two other musical giants: Canadian Hall of Fame singer/songwriter Paul Anka and multiple Grammy-winning rocker Alanis Morissette. His family then moved to Burlington, Ontario, and he grew up in a musically inclined house, listening to everything from show tunes to Motown. While he dropped music lessons after six months, something else inspired him, explaining, “When the Beatles and the British Invasion came around, I'd hang around a record store, Music Village in Burlington, and learned guitar from listening to records. That store shaped who I am. Much of that time—Malcolm Gladwell’s ‘10,000-Hour Rule’—was spent alone in my parents’ basement with a record player and a guitar.” He quips, “I'm the proud owner of hundreds of heavily scratched vinyl records!”

Most noteworthy, his real inspiration was seeing The Beatles on The Ed Sullivan Show with hundreds of girls screaming. He recalls, “I was no different than a million other guys when I saw The Beatles— the band blew our minds. But my desire to become a musician was really George Harrison’s fault. I loved the way he hung back and played all the interesting parts—a guitar solo and the little licks here and there. That's when I knew I wanted to be a guitarist and make a career of it. Even though I'd never picked up a guitar, I wanted to be just like George Harrison.”

Similarly, like The Beatles to Hendrix, Eric Clapton and Jack White today, LaBarge was mostly self-taught, and was fortunate to have a musical ear and good hand/eye coordination. On top of that, from that day he saw Harrison and visualized becoming a working musician, LaBarge stuck to a plan—his modus operandi

Career beginnings
As a result, another essential part of LaBarge's “modus operandi” was learning from the mentors he was fortunate to encounter: “The Mandala was the first live band I ever saw, and guitarist Domenic Troiano and the band changed my life." ‘Donnie’ was one of the leading proponents of the unique ‘Toronto sound’—full of the blues, rock and a lot of soul. Troiano's previous band The Rogues had opened for the Rolling Stones in 1966 at Maple Leaf Gardens in Toronto, and the legend-in-the-making became influential to LaBarge in many ways. So, a big turning point was moving to Toronto. “I wanted to be the small fish in a big pond, just to see if I could cut it,” confesses LaBarge.

The first band he formed in Toronto was Stingaree, and he used another key element of his “MO”—he strived to be the worst guy in the band, explaining: “I knew what I wanted to see; dual guitars, endless solos, playing covers and originals. So, I went about putting together a dream band. I scouted good players, and I coaxed them to quit their bands. I bought a truck, and had an agent lined up. In the process, I had a motto—I strived to be worst guy in the band. I have always looked for situations where I would be challenged on stage by players who made me play to the best of my ability. Players who also forced me to push the envelope, and Stingaree certainly accomplished that. It was the best way to improve.”

1970s
He began playing professionally in 1967, and then during the 1970s into the early 1980s, young LaBarge toured with various bands as a guitarist/frontman. He enjoyed the thrill of being on the road and especially accomplishing something by reaching out to people in performance. But he'd never wanted to be a rock star, suggesting, “I have an ego, but it goes in another direction. It's more about listen to me as opposed to watch me.” So, the last years of the 1970s saw him start to segue into an area he had always wanted, session and studio work.

He recalls that as a kid, while he was learning to play guitar along with records, he thought he'd like to be a session guy. Especially when he listened to best-selling compilation records from K-tel International (based in Winnipeg, Manitoba, Canada), which often featured re-recordings of original hits. And, young LaBarge had thought he could do better. His father had been a tape recorder freak, so they had all sorts of equipment in the family basement. LaBarge figured out how to tape songs off the radio, opening up another track and playing along with it: “I wanted to be that session guy playing that great cover, and embellishing the tune like George Harrison did to Beatles tunes. And I ultimately wanted to work with the professionals and get it on tape.”

1980s
By 1980, LaBarge was performing with Kearney, King, McBride and LaBarge at the world-famous El Mocambo, where the Rolling Stones and countless others had played. Bernie also logged hundreds of hours at Grant Ave. Studio in Hamilton, Ontario. He began to meet legends and mentors like Domenic Troiano and Long John Baldry, and recorded at internationally famous state-of-the-art Le Studio in Morin Heights, where such acts as Rush, The Police, Chicago, David Bowie, and Cat Stevens had also recorded.

So, he decided to get off the road in 1981, watching how a mega-successful band like Steely Dan had chosen to retire from live performances to become a studio-only band, so he looked to do more studio work for himself. He wrote “Dream Away,” produced by Lanois, and it was originally released as a single in 1981. Bernie continued to write for himself and others, finally landing a contract with Sony Records to record Barging In. That record earned him that Canadian Juno Award nomination in 1984 for Most Promising Male Vocalist. He admits he was shocked, having “no concept that he was even nominated for a Juno Award.”

But after the initial single release in 1981 of “Dream Away,” he didn't have a band to go out and support that hit single, but confesses he had no desire to go out on the road: “I felt that it's a whole other thing on the road. It's hard to write and hard to live your life. The record was a wonderful addition to my expanding career, so I decided to let it speak for itself with radio airplay. I was now thinking of myself as a studio guy who had a record out there but who didn't want to have a solo career and be on the road.”

Indeed, in the late 1970s, he had already started doing jingles at Grant Avenue (studio) in Hamilton with Dan Lanois and his brother Bob. Very soon, he says he sang and played—singing as much as he played guitar—on 200 jingles for local companies. He later went on to performing on hundreds of worldwide jingles (Coke, Pepsi, GM, Ford), and countless recording sessions with legendary producer Jack Richardson. LaBarge also managed to squeeze in playing on such high-profile TV series Smith & Smith (1979–85), Party with The Rovers (1983–86), Danger Bay (1985–1989) on CBC, and The Doodlebops. He recalls: “Everything came together in that decade. It was a great time on a great run —I was confident, motivated, and I was not going to stop.”

Along the way, one of many high points was playing guitar for the international hit TV show Fraggle Rock (1983–87) created by celebrated animator/puppeteer Jim Henson: “When I passed the audition, I realized then that I was in the big leagues.”

1990s to 2000s
He did not want to leave that all behind to go on the road but also found a regular local gig that fitted his busy session and commercial work. Then in the 1990s, he performed with The Irish Rovers, Mind Over Matter, The Danny B Blues Band, Cassandra Vasik, and The Incontinentals. He also became the lead guitarist for The Dexters in 1994, and began playing at The Orbit Room, a local Toronto bar co-owned by Rush's Lifeson, who often jammed with the band. In the process, LaBarge had the distinction of playing at The Orbit Room for more than 1000 appearances—a tough record to break. In November 2014, The Dexters completed their twentieth anniversary at The Orbit Room with a farewell appearance.

An unfortunate fall and injury, then subsequent surgery in 2015 kept him from even practicing guitar. But, you can't keep a good man down, and LaBarge relates: “I couldn't even make a fist for more than four years, but with physio, relearning guitar, and a whole lot of support from friends and family, I slowly got most of my chops back. The Dexters reunion in January 2020 was my first concert in five years, and now I'm back recording. Like I always say—just keep practicing.”

Influences
One of the key elements to success beyond hard work—those 10,000 Hours—is meeting and being influenced by mentors. One was Jack Richardson, renowned for producing the biggest hit records from The Guess Who from 1969 to 1975. LaBarge says Richardson became like a “surrogate father” to him after they met: “I got booked to do my first session, with the legendary Jack Richardson around 1983, for singer/songwriter Christopher Ward. Jack and I, along with David Greene, Jack's favorite engineer, hit it off immediately, and I guess I did a good job. Jack started booking me for all sorts of sessions, and he, David and I became quite the team. Jack introduced me to The Irish Rovers—and I worked with them on their television show, Party With The Rovers. Jack also recommended me for the audition for Fraggle Rock. So his influence has been immense. I loved Jack and his wife Shirley, and I still keep in close touch with his kids.”

Another major influence was Canadian Music Hall of Fame inductee and international music legend, guitarist Domenic Troiano, who inspired LaBarge all the way back to high school: “Donnie's band, The Mandala, was the first live band I saw at high school, and they changed my life. Around 1980, Donnie and I later became close friends, and I first got to hold his Tele shortly thereafter, due to a great deal of persistence on my part. Fast forward many years, coupled with the untimely passing of Donnie, his brother Frank asked me if I'd like to hold on to the guitar for a bit. I can't describe what it felt like to have come full circle from that high school to actually playing his guitar, which oozes The Toronto Sound. It IS that sound, although Donnie was the only one who could squeeze those sounds from it. I am merely a facsimile of what I learned from my friend. Not a gig or session goes by where I don't try to ask him for guidance. That guitar should be in every soul and music museum everywhere. I wouldn't have had the capacity to be any more thrilled if I had the chance to play Hendrix's Strat or George Harrison's Gretsch.”

David Clayton-Thomas, multiple Grammy Award-winning Canadian musician, singer/songwriter, best known as the lead vocalist of the American band Blood, Sweat & Tears, says of working with LaBarge: “I’ve known Bernie LaBarge for decades. We’ve recorded and toured the world together, and working with him was always a joy. The ultimate groove player and one of the finest blues players alive.”

LaBarge's many other influences include (in no particular order) Jimi Hendrix, George Harrison, Curtis Mayfield, James Burton, Eric Clapton, Carlos Santana, Albert King, Domenic Troiano, Steve Cropper, Jeff Beck, Steely Dan, Elvis Costello, Robin Trower, Howard Roberts, Elliott Randall, Rick Derringer, Elliot Easton, Peter Frampton, Gary Moore, Peter Green, and Kenny Marco.

As for how LaBarge influenced other musicians, Danny Weis of Lou Reed, Iron Butterfly, Bette Midler, and Rhinoceros fame, offers: “If you have Bernie LaBarge on your gig, you know you're covered. He always knows the right thing to play, and always has a smile. When he played with me on the Rhinoceros reunions gig in 2009, it felt like the original band was back together as he covered that guitar part perfectly. When you've got Bernie on stage, you're in for a good time. He's a great guitar player and a great friend.”

Partial discography

 Catwalk – Rain (1972 single Axe Records)
 Louise – Rain (1973 single Axe Records)
 China – China (1978)
 Dream Away – Bernie LaBarge (1981 WEA single, produced by Daniel Lanois)
 Long John Baldry – Long John Baldry (EMI 1980)
 Effective Immediately – Zwol (EMI 1981)
 Time Stands Still – Christopher Ward (1981)
 Bit Parts – The Extras (musical group) (1981, Ready Records)
 No More Bread and Butter – The Irish Rovers (1981, Attic Records)
 The Minx – Belinda Metz (1982)
 Thrillz – Zwol – (A&M 1982)
 Gowan – Lawrence Gowan (1982)
 Postcard – Garnett Ford (1982)
 Two Hound Blues – King Biscuit Boy (Richard Newell) (1982)
 Love Me Closer – Hagood Hardy (1982 Attic Records)
 Priceless – Lisa Price (1983)
 Barging In – Bernie LaBarge (Sony 1983)
 Can't Hold On Forever – Bernie LaBarge (1983 single)
 Champions – Canadian Brass (1983 Sony)
 The Curly Shuffle – The Knuckleheads (Attic 1983)
 Weekend – The Shakers (1983)
 Rough Side of Town – Johnny Lovesin (A&M)
 Overnight Sensation – Bernie LaBarge (1984 single)
 A Test of Time – Darkroom (WEA)
 2W0 – Strange Advance (1985)
 Listen to a Boy in Love – Bernie LaBarge (1985 single)
 Heartbeat – Priscilla Wright (1985 Attic Records)
 The Passerby – Tony Kosinec (1985)
 Party with The Rovers – The Irish Rovers (1985)
 Lookin' For a Heartache – P.J. Morris (1986?)
 Ronnie Hawkins – Ronnie Hawkins (1987 Epic Records)
 Turn On the Lights Before You Leave – Bernie LaBarge (1987 RCA single)
 Silver Anniversary – The Irish Rovers (1989)
 Aural Fixations – Kim Mitchell (1992)
 Some Other Time – Tim Thorney (1993)
 Mothers of Hope – John James (Attic 1994)
 Hip to the Tip – The Dexters (1995)
 Feels Like Home – Cassandra Vasik (1995)
 Greatest Hits – Kim Mitchell 1996
 All The Good'uns – Ian Tyson (1996)
 Much Too Late – The Danny B Blues Band (1996)
 Life is But a Dream – Joel Feeney (1996)
 Mother and Child – Paige Stroman (2001)
 Side One – The Stickmen (2002)
 Suzana Da Câmara- Suzana Da Câmara (2003)
 Different – Cassandra Vasik (2003)
 Side Two – The Stickmen (2003)
 Get on the Bus – The Doodlebops (2005)
 Fill Your Head With Rock – Kim Mitchell (2005)
 In Concert-A Musical Biography – David Clayton-Thomas (2006)
 I Love Being Here With You – Dione Taylor (2006)
 Anthology, Vol. 1: The Hot Tunes – Dave Rave (2006)
 Christmas Lullabies to Create Memories – Paige Stroman (2006)
 Jon Levine Band – Jon Levine Band (2007)
 Classics – George Canyon (2007)
 The Evergreens – David Clayton-Thomas (2007)
 You Can't Make Peace – Riley / B / LaBarge (2007)
 Headlights and Tailpipes – Willie Mack (2007)
 Sing – Theo Tams (Canadian Idol 2008)
 Disney Music Block Party – Various (2008)
 Spectrum – David Clayton-Thomas (2009)
 Salvation Radio – Brett Ryan (2010)
 Drop the Needle in the Groove – Dean McTaggart (2010)
 Soul Ballads – David Clayton-Thomas (2010)
 Welcome to the Boogaloo Lounge – Lou Pomanti (2011)
 When – Denis Keldie (2011)
 A Blues for the New World – David Clayton-Thomas (Universal 2013)
 The Unicorn 50th anniversary remake – The Irish Rovers (2019)

LaBarge's bands
 1967 – The Underground Taxi Service
 1968 – 1969 – The Royal Banke
 1969 – 1972 – Stem
 1972 – 1973 – Rain
 1973 – 1974 – The Jax 'n Lynda
 1974 – George Olliver's Blue-Eyed Brotherhood
 1974 – 1975 – Hot Dog
 1975 – 1976 – Whizz
 1976 – 1977 – Stingaree
 1978 – 1979 – Bond
 1979 – Sweet Blindness
 1980 – Zwol
 1980 – 1981 – Kearney, King, McBride & LaBarge
 1983 – 1990 – The Irish Rovers
 1987 – Mind Over Matter
 1989–present – The Danny B Blues Band
 1992 – 1994 – Cassandra Vasik
 1994–2014 – The Dexters
 1999 – 2000 – The Incontinentals
 1999 – 2002 – Off The Record
 2002 – 2006 – The Stickmen
 2005–2009 – David Clayton-Thomas
 2009 – Rhinoceros (band)

References

External links
 Bernie LaBarge Official Site
 Bernie's story so far

1953 births
Living people
Canadian blues guitarists
Canadian male guitarists
Canadian rhythm and blues musicians
Canadian rock guitarists
Musicians from Ottawa
People from Burlington, Ontario
Lead guitarists
Rhinoceros (band) members
Mensans